Beta Play (formerly Tommy & the High Pilots) is an alternative rock band from Santa Barbara, California. The band consists of lead vocalist/guitarist Tommy Cantillon, keyboardist Michael Cantillon, and bassist Mike Dyer.

Background
Originally performing as Tommy & the High Pilots, the band released a number of albums, including Everynight, American Riviera, Only Human, and Tommy & the High Pilots: Live at Studio Delux.

In 2014, the band underwent a change, reforming and rebranding as Beta Play in early 2015. According to lead vocalist, Tommy Cantillon, the members began to feel like a new group after the release of "Only Human" in 2013. Their new style, coupled with Cantillon's discomfort being the only member with his name in the group's title, prompted them to change their name. Cantillon drew his inspiration for the new name from the boxes of Betamax video tapes his father had left in the garage where he wrote the band's music.

The band released a self-titled 5-song EP in 2015, featuring the single "Heaven Is Under The Sun."

Members

Current members 

Tommy Cantillon - lead vocals, guitar
 Michael Cantillon - guitar, keyboard
 Mike Dyer - bass

Former Members
 Steven Libby - bass
Matt Palermo - drums

Live Members 

 Dan Moore (2019 - current)

Discography 

As Beta Play

As Tommy & the High Pilots

References

External links
 Beta Play Facebook page
 @webetaplay, Twitter

Musical groups from California
Musical groups established in 2008
Pop punk groups from California